Comingone Ymbon is an Indian politician from Meghalaya. He has been elected in Meghalaya Legislative Assembly election in 2018 from Raliang constituency as candidate of National People's Party. He was Minister of Fisheries, General Administration in Conrad Sangma ministry from 2018.

References 

Living people
National People's Party (India) politicians
Meghalaya MLAs 2018–2023
Year of birth missing (living people)
People from West Jaintia Hills district
Indian National Congress politicians